This is a list of the Permanent Representatives of Tuvalu to the United Nations. The current office holder is H. E. Samuelu Laloniu.

List

See also
Foreign relations of Tuvalu

References

Tuvalu

United Nations